Anne Elizabeth Curry (who publishes as Anne Curry and A. E. Curry) (born 27 May 1954) is an English historian and Officer of Arms.

Career 
She is professor of Medieval history at the University of Southampton and dean of the Faculty of Humanities. She is former editor of the Journal of Medieval History, and a specialist in the Hundred Years' War.

She graduated with BA and MA degrees from the University of Manchester before obtaining a PhD from Teesside Polytechnic on ‘Military Organization in Lancastrian Normandy 1422-50'.

She was president of the Historical Association from 2008 to 2011. She was also a vice-president of the Royal Historical Society.

In 2022 she was appointed Arundel Herald Extraordinary.

Published works 
 Curry, A.E., 'The impact of War and Occupation on Urban Life in Normandy, 1417-1450', in French History, 1 (1987), 157–181. 
 Curry, A.E., 'The Nationality of Men-at-Arms serving in English armies in Normandy and the pays de conquete (1415-1450) in Reading Medieval Studies 18 (1992), 135–163.
 Curry, Anne with Hughes, Michael (editors). (1994). Arms, Armies and Fortifications in the Hundred Years War. The Boydell Press (UK) 
 Curry, Anne with Bates, David (1994). England and Normandy in the Middle Ages. Hambledon Continuum. 
 Curry, Anne with Matthew, Elizabeth (editors) (2000). The Fifteenth Century: Concepts and Patterns of Service in the Later Middle Ages (vol. 1: Fifteenth Century). The Boydell Press (UK). 
 Curry, Anne (ed.) (2000) Agincourt 1415. Tempus (UK). 
 Curry, Anne (2000). The Battle of Agincourt: Sources and Interpretations. The Boydell Press (UK) 
 Curry, Anne and Matthew, E., Concepts and Patterns of Service in the Late Middle Ages (Woodbridge, 2000)
 Curry, Anne (2003) The Hundred Years' War (British History in Perspective series). Palgrave Macmillan; 2nd revised edition. 
 Curry, Anne (2005) The Parliament rolls of Medieval England 1275-1504. Henry VI 1422-31. Boydell & Brewer (UK).
 Curry, Anne (2005) The Parliament rolls of Medieval England 1275-1504. Henry VI 1432-1445. Boydell & Brewer (UK).
 Curry, Anne (2005). Agincourt: A New History. Tempus (UK). 
 Curry, Anne, (with Robert Hardy) (2006) Agincourt 1415: The Archers' Story. Tempus (UK). 9780752445663.
 Curry, Anne (2015) Henry V: Playboy Prince to Warrior King. Penguin Books (UK).

References

British military writers
British historians
British military historians
Living people
1954 births
British women historians
Alumni of the University of Manchester
Academics of the University of Southampton
Alumni of Teesside University
English officers of arms